Nà Vuccà Dò Lupù (Sicilian for Into the mouth of the wolf) is the debut studio album of Three Mile Pilot, released on November 16, 1992 by Headhunter Records.

Track listing

Personnel 
Adapted from the Nà Vuccà Dò Lupù liner notes.

Three Mile Pilot
 Pall Jenkins – vocals
 Armistead Burwell Smith IV – bass guitar, backing vocals
 Tom Zinser – drums
Additional musicians
 Jim French – Saxophone, Lur, Kalumus, Kühorn, Svegl

Production and additional personnel
 Randy Antler – design
 Jeff Forrest – engineering
 Three Mile Pilot – production, cover art, photography

Release history

References

External links 
 

1992 debut albums
Headhunter Records albums
Three Mile Pilot albums